Druker v. Commissioner of Internal Revenue, 697 F.2d 46 (2d Cir. 1982), is a decision of the United States Court of Appeals for the Second Circuit affirming the constitutionality of the marriage penalty.

The plaintiffs, James O. Druker and his wife Joan, claimed that the "income tax structure unfairly discriminates against working married couples" in violation of the equal protection clause of the Fourteenth Amendment.

References

External links

United States Court of Appeals for the Second Circuit cases
United States equal protection case law
United States taxation and revenue case law
1982 in United States case law